Inalcanzable (Eng.: "Unreachable") is the fifteenth studio album released by Los Bukis on July 1, 1993. The album was certified gold in the United States by the RIAA and was nominated for Pop Album of the Year at the 6th Lo Nuestro Awards.

Track listing

All songs written and composed by Marco Antonio Solís

Chart performance

Sales and certifications

References

External links
[] Inalcanzable on billboard.com
 Inalcanzable on social.zune.net

Los Bukis albums
1993 albums
Fonovisa Records albums